Diana Dragutinović (born 6 May 1958, Belgrade, SR Serbia, Yugoslavia) is a Serbian economist, who was Minister of Finance in the Government of Serbia from 2008–11.

Biography
Dragutinović graduated from the University of Belgrade Faculty of Economics where she also received an MSc and a PhD and still lectures. From 2001–02, she was special advisor at the Ministry of Finance and Economy, as well as a special advisor at the International Monetary Fund (2002–04).

From 1 September 2004 she was the Vice Governor of the National Bank of Serbia to Radovan Jelašić, in charge of coordination and management of research and statistics, monetary policy and payment systems.

Her main areas of research are macroeconomics, econometric modelling, financial programming, long-term economic growth theory, convergence analysis, inflation, monetary and fiscal policy, poverty and social policy.

Dragutinović was elected to the position of Minister for Finance on 7 July 2008. During the reconstruction of Cvetković's Government on 14 March 2011, she was dismissed from the position of Minister for Finance. Following that, she returned to the National Bank of Serbia and reclaimed the position of the Vice Governor of the National Bank of Serbia, under the Governor Dejan Šoškić and retaining the same position under Governor Jorgovanka Tabaković as well.

Personal life
She is the author of textbooks, ten monographs and over 50 studies, articles and papers.

She is married and a mother of two children.

References

External links

 Diana Dragutinović biography
 Management of the National Bank of Serbia

1958 births
Living people
Politicians from Belgrade
University of Belgrade Faculty of Economics alumni
Democratic Party (Serbia) politicians
Finance ministers of Serbia
Government ministers of Serbia
Women government ministers of Serbia
Female finance ministers
21st-century Serbian women politicians
21st-century Serbian politicians
Academic staff of the University of Belgrade